Shamel Bazar (also Romanized as Shamel Bāzār; also known as Shamīl Bāzār) is a village in Polan Rural District, Polan District, Chabahar County, Sistan and Baluchestan Province, Iran. At the 2006 census, its population was 38, in 8 families.

References 

Populated places in Chabahar County